Yalghuz Aghaj (also Romanized as Yālghūz Āghāj; also known as Ālūzāqaj, Holzāqāch, Huluzagach, Yalghuz Aghach, Yalqūz Aghāj, Yālqūz Āghāj, and Yalqūz Āqāj) is a village in Yalghuz Aghaj Rural District, Serishabad District, Qorveh County, Kurdistan Province, Iran. At the 2006 census, its population was 1,123, in 256 families. The village is populated by Kurds.

References 

Towns and villages in Qorveh County
Kurdish settlements in Kurdistan Province